ZFP69 zinc finger protein is a protein that in humans is encoded by the ZFP69 gene.

References

Further reading 

Human proteins